Southbridge and Blackstone Railroad was a historic railroad that originally operated between Blackstone, Massachusetts, and Southbridge, Massachusetts, and its remaining functional tracks are now owned and operated by the Providence and Worcester Railroad.

According to the Town of Norfolk website: the Southbridge and Blackstone was chartered in 1849 to build a railroad between Blackstone and Southbridge, Massachusetts passing through the northeast corner of Connecticut in East Thompson. After a series of financial problems and scandals, many of these smaller companies were absorbed into the Boston and New York Central Railroad. The new company revised the ending point of the Blackstone & Southbridge, moving the terminus from Southbridge to Mechanicsville, Connecticut, just north of Putnam, Connecticut. Here, the new line intersected an existing rail line which traveled north-south from New London, Connecticut, to Worcester, Massachusetts.

The track known as the Southbridge Running Track was also part of the railroad, and in 2004 the Providence and Worcester Railroad requested an abandonment exemption of this track from the Department of Transportation.

References

Massachusetts railroads
Regional railroads in the United States